Trichilia areolata is a species of plant in the family Meliaceae. It is endemic to Brazil.  It is threatened by habitat loss.

References

areolata
Endemic flora of Brazil
Flora of the Amazon
Vulnerable flora of South America
Taxonomy articles created by Polbot